Zdziar Wielki is a village in the administrative district of Gmina Staroźreby, within Płock County, Masovian Voivodeship, in east-central Poland.

References

External link

Zdziar Wielki
Płock Governorate
Warsaw Voivodeship (1919–1939)